Arcobräu is a brewery located in the Lower Bavarian municipality of Moos, Germany. The brewery has been owned by the family Arco-Zinneberg for 450 years. Their flagship beer is "Mooser Liesl", a Helles, meaning "Liesl from Moos".

History 
The first documented mention of the Schlossbrauerei Moos ("Palace Brewery of Moos") was in 1567. The company is based in Moos and exists in its current form since 1960, after a merger of several family-owned breweries. In the early 1990s, Arcobräu acquired several smaller breweries in Eastern Bavaria.

At the end of 2010, a dispute emerged between Arcobräu and the nearby town of Deggendorf pertaining to an additional beer tent at the Deggendorfer Volksfest, which culminated in corruption accusations against local elected officials. This dispute was referred to as the Bierkrieg ("Beer war") by the local media and continued into the first half of 2011.

References 

Beer and breweries in Bavaria
Companies based in Bavaria
1567 establishments in the Holy Roman Empire